Asawa is a surname. Notable people with the surname include: 

Amit Asawa (born 1963), Indian cricketer
Brian Asawa (1966–2016), American singer
Ruth Asawa (1926–2013), American sculptor
Ruth Asawa San Francisco School of the Arts

See also
Asada (surname)